Alfred Jefferies (9 February 1922 – 9 February 1998) was an English professional footballer who played as a goalkeeper in the Football League for Brentford and Torquay United.

Career

Early years 
A goalkeeper, Jefferies began his career as an amateur with Arsenal, before signing for hometown Isthmian League club Oxford City and making an appearance in the club's final competitive match before the outbreak of the Second World War in 1939. He made 169 appearances for the club between 1938 and 1947. While stationed at Colchester Garrison in 1946, he made an appearance for the town's local Southern League club.

Brentford 
Jefferies turned professional and joined Second Division club Brentford in September 1947 and finally made his debut in a 1–0 defeat to Southampton on 29 October 1949. Jefferies went on to largely keep established goalkeepers Ted Gaskell and Reg Newton out of the team, but he finally lost his place to Newton during a disastrous 1953–54 season, in which Brentford were relegated to the Third Division South. He departed Griffin Park in August 1954, after making 121 appearances during seven years with the Bees.

Torquay United 
Jefferies signed for Third Division South club Torquay United in August 1954 and missed just one league game during the 1954–55 season. He left the club at the end of the campaign.

Non-League football 
Jefferies dropped into non-League football and returned home to Oxfordshire to sign for Birmingham & District League First Division club Banbury Spencer in 1955. He later managed Metropolitan & District League club Didcot Town.

Personal life 
Jefferies' brother Ray and son Alan were contracted to Brentford, but neither made a first team appearance.

Career statistics

References

1922 births
English footballers
Oxford City F.C. players
Colchester United F.C. players
Brentford F.C. players
Torquay United F.C. players
Banbury United F.C. players
English Football League players
Association football goalkeepers
1998 deaths
Didcot Town F.C. managers
Arsenal F.C. players
Isthmian League players
Southern Football League players
English football managers